FoCo Roller Derby, formerly FoCo Girls Gone Derby, is a women's flat track roller derby league based in Fort Collins, Colorado. Founded in 2006, the league currently consists of two teams, and two mixed teams which compete against teams from other leagues. FoCo is a member of the Women's Flat Track Derby Association (WFTDA).

Teams
The league's two home teams have evolved over the years. Originally the Chanel Cartel and the Death Row Dolls, which later became the Cinder Hellas and Psycho Sirens in 2009, and finally the Ale Marys and The Growlers in 2019. 
The Micro Bruisers is the league's primary all-star team for inter-league competition and is composed of skaters from the two home teams. 
The Brew Crew, a second travel team for up-and-coming stars, also had an identity change from the Punchy Brewsters in 2018. 
New recruits are not referred to as "Fresh Meat" as in other roller derby leagues, but as "Fresh Hops" to fit in with the rest of the leagues' brewing theme.

History
FoCo was founded in January 2006 and was accepted as a member of the Women's Flat Track Derby Association in January 2009.  Several other leagues have origins in FoCo, including the Choice City Rebels, and the Slaughterhouse Derby Girls. 

Since 2009, FoCo has held an annual "Black and Blue Ball", a formal event featuring an intraleague bout and an annual Salt N' Pepper bout which allows a mixed team of skaters and officials a change to switch roles and play or officiate.

At the start of FoCo's 10th season, the league rebranded from FoCo Girls Gone Derby to FoCo Roller Derby to represent inclusiveness, athleticism and the local community.

Mid-season 2018, FoCo Roller Derby lost their main events and practice venue, The Events Center, and are still in search of a new home in Northern Colorado.

WFTDA rankings

References

Sports in Fort Collins, Colorado
Roller derby leagues established in 2006
Roller derby leagues in Colorado
Women's Flat Track Derby Association Division 3
2006 establishments in Colorado